Xanthostemon umbrosus is a tree species in the family Myrtaceae that is endemic to Australia.

It blooms in between May and June producing yellow-cream coloured flowers.

It is found in sandstone crevices in the Kimberley region of Western Australia and is also found in the top end of the Northern Territory and north Queensland.

References

umbrosus
Rosids of Western Australia
Plants described in 1982
Flora of the Northern Territory
Flora of Queensland